The Georgia Cup (Georgian: საქართველოს თასი) is the main "knockout" cup competition in Georgian rugby.

List of Champions

Rugby union competitions in Georgia (country)